The third season of Kaguya-sama: Love Is War, titled Kaguya-sama: Love Is War – Ultra Romantic, is a 2022 Japanese anime series, based on the manga series of the same title, written and illustrated by Aka Akasaka. It was announced on October 25, 2020 for production during the "Kaguya-sama Wants To Tell You On Stage" special event. The season aired from April 9 to June 25, 2022, with returning staff and cast members. The opening theme song is "GIRI GIRI" by Masayuki Suzuki featuring Suu from Silent Siren, while the ending theme is "Heart wa Oteage" ("My Heart Does Not Know What to Do") by Airi Suzuki. In episode 5, the ending theme song is "My Nonfiction" by Makoto Furukawa and Konomi Kohara as their characters of Miyuki and Chika, respectively. The season finale aired on June 25 as a double episode has "Sentimental Crisis" by Halca as the ending theme song.


Episode list

References

Kaguya-sama: Love Is War episode lists
2022 Japanese television seasons